

Cutting the Stone, also called The Extraction of the Stone of Madness or The Cure of Folly, is a painting by Hieronymus Bosch, displayed in the Museo del Prado in Madrid, completed around 1494 or later.

The painting depicts a surgeon, wearing a funnel hat, removing the stone of madness from a patient's head by trepanation. An assistant, a monk bearing a tankard, stands nearby. Playing on the double-meaning of the word  (stone or bulb), the stone appears as a flower bulb, while another flower rests on the table. A woman with a book balanced on her head looks on.
 
The inscription in gold-coloured Gothic script reads:

Lubbert Das was a comical (foolish) character in Dutch literature.

Interpretations
It is possible that the flower hints that the doctor is a charlatan as does the funnel hat. The woman balancing a book on her head is thought by Skemer to be a satire of the Flemish custom of wearing amulets made out of books and scripture, a pictogram for the word phylactery. Otherwise, she is thought to depict folly.

Michel Foucault, in his History of Madness, says "Bosch's famous doctor is far more insane than the patient he is attempting to cure, and his false knowledge does nothing more than reveal the worst excesses of a madness immediately apparent to all but himself."

References

Further reading

(book on head) Binding Words Textual Amulets in the Middle Ages. Skemer, Don C. PA: Penn State University Press, 2006. p. 24, 136n. .

"Extracting the Stone of Madness in perspective: the cultural and historical development of an enigmatic visual motif from Hieronymus Bosch: a critical status quaestionis at academia.edu

 "A Stone Never Cut for: A New Interpretation of  The Cure of Folly  by Jheronimus Bosch" in Urologia Internationalis

1494 paintings
Paintings by Hieronymus Bosch
Paintings of the Museo del Prado by Dutch artists